Emma Koster (born 29 May 1984) is a former Australian netball player. Between 2003 and 2007, Koster played for Hunter Jaegers and AIS Canberra Darters in the Commonwealth Bank Trophy league. She later played for New South Wales Swifts in the ANZ Championship during the 2008 and 2009 seasons. She was a member of the Swifts team that won inaugural 2008 ANZ Championship. She also represented Australia at under-21 level.

Early life, education and employment
Koster is originally from the Blue Mountains region of New South Wales. Between 1997 and 2002 she attended St Columba's Catholic College. Between 2009 and 2012 she attended the University of Western Sydney. Since 2020, Koster has worked for the Western Sydney Local Health District.

Playing career

NSWIS
Between 2003 and 2004, Koster played for the New South Wales Institute of Sport. She was named the NSWIS Netball Player of the Year Award, shared the NSWIS Netball
Players' Player Award and was awarded the Marj Groves Medal, presented to an NSWIS athlete by Netball New South Wales.

Commonwealth Bank Trophy
Between 2003 and 2007, Koster made 50 appearances for Hunter Jaegers and AIS Canberra Darters in the Commonwealth Bank Trophy league. In 2007 she played in every quarter for Hunter Jaegers and was a member of the team's leadership group. She was subsequently named the Netball NSW Marilyn Melhuish Commonwealth Bank Trophy Player of the Year.

New South Wales Swifts
Koster played for New South Wales Swifts in the ANZ Championship during the 2008 and 2009 seasons. She was a member of Swifts' inaugural ANZ Championship squad, helping them win the 2008 ANZ Championship. She made her ANZ Championship debut in the 2008 Round 4 match against Central Pulse. She was subsequently named the 2008 NSW Swifts Players' Player of the Year.

Australia
In 2005 Koster represented Australia at under-21 level. She was a member of the Australia team that won a bronze medal at the 2005 World Youth Netball Championships.

Honours
New South Wales Swifts
ANZ Championship
Winners: 2008

Individual Awards

Notes
  Shared the award with Laura Brealey.

References

1984 births
Living people
Australian netball players
Netball players from New South Wales
New South Wales Institute of Sport netball players
Hunter Jaegers players
AIS Canberra Darters players
New South Wales Swifts players
ANZ Championship players
Western Sydney University alumni
People from the Blue Mountains (New South Wales)